James C. Lewis was an All-American lacrosse player at Navy from 1964 to 1966, leading the Midshipmen to national titles in each of his three years, as well as perfect seasons. Navy's national titles during these years were under the Wingate Memorial Trophy format where national champions were selected by committee.

Navy career

In 1966, The Baltimore Sun called Lewis the "greatest living lacrosseman". He is ranked fifth all-time in Navy men's lacrosse scoring with 169 career points. Lewis earned first-team All America honors all three years while in college, as well as being named the Jack Turnbull Award winner in 1964, 1965 and 1966. In 1965, Lewis led Navy to a 12 and 0 record while defeating Army 18-7 en route to the Midshipmen's fourth straight undisputed national championship. During this stretch Navy won 22nd games in a row. Lewis led Navy to three straight National Championships at a time when the top team was voted on by the USILA.

This is considered the greatest stretch of lacrosse in Navy lacrosse history, an eight-year period from 1960 through 1968, where Navy won outright or shared in eight straight national titles.

Lewis was elected to the National Lacrosse Hall of Fame in 1981, and is generally considered the top Navy lacrosse player of all time. He won the Navy's Sword For Men award in 1966 and also graduated from TOPGUN, the elite United States Navy Fighter Weapons School.

Lewis was All-American lacrosse player at Uniondale High School on Long Island, where he also played soccer. He still holds the single-game New York high school lacrosse record for points with 21.

In the 1964 NCAA Men's Soccer Championship finals against Michigan State, Lewis scored the game's only goal to help the Midshipmen to their only NCAA soccer title and was named Tournament Most Outstanding Player.

Statistics
Statistics are available on Navy Lacrosse media guides. See Navy lacrosse official site link below.

United States Naval Academy

 * Lewis played during the pre-NCAA days under USILA jurisdiction. With 4.97 points-per-game during his career, this would rank Lewis among the top 20 all-time.

Accomplishments
1966 Wingate Memorial Trophy (College Champions - Navy)
1965 Wingate Memorial Trophy (College Champions - Navy)
1964 Wingate Memorial Trophy (College Champions - Navy)
1964 NCAA Division I Men's Soccer Championship (College Champions - Navy)

See also
National Lacrosse Hall of Fame
Wingate Memorial Trophy
Navy Midshipmen men's lacrosse
NCAA Division I men's lacrosse records
1964 NCAA Division I Men's Soccer Championship

References

External links
New York high school lacrosse records
US Lacrosse HOF entry
Navy's Star With A Stick
Hopkins Lost A Title And Maybe A Tradition
Navy Lacrosse Official Site
US Lacrosse to honor 1965 Navy national championship team

Awards

Year of birth missing (living people)
Living people
United States Naval Academy alumni
Navy Midshipmen men's lacrosse players
Navy Midshipmen men's soccer players
Association footballers not categorized by position
NCAA Division I Men's Soccer Tournament Most Outstanding Player winners
People from Uniondale, New York
Sportspeople from Nassau County, New York
Soccer players from New York (state)
Lacrosse players from New York (state)
Lacrosse forwards
Association football players not categorized by nationality